Dominic Bryce Hubbard, 6th Baron Addington (born 24 August 1963), is a British Liberal Democrat politician, the president of the British Dyslexic Association and the vice-president of the UK Sports Association.

Early life 
Addington was educated at The Hewett School, Norwich, before going up to the Aberdeen University, graduating as M.A. in 1988.

Career 
He succeeded to the title of Baron Addington, of Addington, Co. Buckingham, at the death of his father, James Hubbard, 5th Baron Addington, a former British South Africa Police officer, in 1982. On taking up his seat at 22 he was the youngest serving peer in the House of Lords.

Lord Addington was returned as one of the ninety elected representative hereditary peers in Parliament in 1999. He sits on the Liberal Democrat benches in the House of Lords and is party spokesperson for sport. He is currently the longest-serving Liberal Democrat member of the House of Lords. He is captain of the Commons and Lords Rugby and Football team, and has played in two Parliamentary World Cups competitions in 1994 and 1999.

Personal life 
In 1999, Addington married Elizabeth Ann Morris, only daughter of Michael Morris, of Duxbury Park, Chorley, Lancashire. Lord and Lady Addington live in Norwich.

The heir presumptive to the title is his younger brother, Michael Hubbard (who by his wife Emmanuella née Ononye has a son, Oliver).

Arms

See also
Baron Addington
Governors of the Bank of England

References

External links 

1963 births
Living people
Politicians from Norwich
Alumni of the University of Aberdeen
Liberal Democrats (UK) hereditary peers
Dominic

Hereditary peers elected under the House of Lords Act 1999